German Texan is both a term to describe immigrants who arrived in the Republic of Texas from Germany from the 1830s onward and an ethnic category that includes their descendants in today's state of Texas. The arriving Germans tended to cluster in ethnic enclaves; the majority settled in a broad, fragmented belt across the south-central part of the state, where many became farmers. As of 1990, about three million Texans considered themselves at least part German in ancestry, a subgroup of German Americans.

History 

Emigration in force began during the period of the Republic of Texas (1836–1846) following the establishment in 1842 of the Adelsverein (Verein zum Schutze deutscher Einwanderer, Society for the Protection of German Immigrants in Texas) by a group of Germans dedicated to colonizing Texas.

The Adelsverein helped establish German colonies throughout the state, including purchasing the Fisher–Miller Land Grant, some 5000 square miles between the Colorado and Llano Rivers. In 1847, John O. Meusebach, acting as commissioner of the Adelsverein, negotiated the Meusebach–Comanche Treaty to settle German colonists on the land grant. It remains the only unbroken treaty between European-American colonists and Native Americans.

A large portion of the early settlers following statehood were Forty-Eighters, emigres from the Revolutions of 1848, who dispersed into areas of Central Texas. After generations, German Texans spoke what became known as Texas German, a German language dialect that was tied to the historic period of highest immigration. In Germany, the language developed differently from how it did among the relatively isolated ethnic colony in the US. The dialect has largely died out since the First and Second World Wars, as have many US German dialects.

After a period of ethnic activism during the 1850s, the Civil War, and Reconstruction, the Germans lived in relative obscurity as teachers, doctors, civil servants, politicians, musicians, farmers, and ranchers. They founded the towns of Bulverde, New Braunfels, Fredericksburg, Boerne, and Comfort in the Texas Hill Country, and Schulenburg, Walburg, and Weimar to the east.

German-American cultural institutions in Texas include the Sophienburg Museum in New Braunfels, the Pioneer Museum in Fredericksburg, the Witte-Schmid Haus Museum in Austin County, the German-Texan Heritage Society, and the Texas German Society.

See also 
 List of German Texans
 Texas German
 History of Fredericksburg, Texas
 Nueces Massacre
 German immigration to Mexico
 German Palatines
 Pennsylvania Dutch
 History of Germany

References

Further reading 
Biesele, Rudolph Leopold, The History of the German Settlements in Texas: 1831–1861. 1930, 1964. Reprint, San Marcos: German-Texan Heritage Society, 1987.
Jordan, Terry G. The German Settlement of Texas after 1865. Southwestern Historical Quarterly. Vol. 73, No. 2, Oct. 1969, pp. 193–212.
Jordan, Terry G. German Seed in Texas Soil: Immigrant Farmers in Nineteenth-Century Texas. Austin: University of Texas Press, 1966, 1975, etc.
Lich, Glen E. The German Texans. San Antonio: University of Texas at San Antonio Institute of Texan Cultures, 1981; revised, 1996.
Lonn, Ella Foreigners in the Confederacy. First published in 1940, it remains the only work on the subject, republished February 2002
The German Texans. San Antonio: University of Texas Institute of Texan Cultures at San Antonio, 1970, 1987. (Pamphlet in the "Texians and Texans" series)

External links 
 German-Texan Heritage Society
 Texas German Society
 Wanderlust: From German to Texan, exhibit at the Witte Museum
 
 Germanic studies, University of Texas at Austin
 Austin Genealogical Society
 German Texan Families
  German immigration to Texas materials, hosted by the Portal to Texas History
 How Luckenbach, Texas Got Its Name

 
History of Texas
European-American society
Austrian-American culture in Texas
Swiss-American culture in Texas
Texas Hill Country